The Marriage of Figaro is a 1786 opera by Wolfgang Amadeus Mozart.

The Marriage of Figaro may also refer to:
 The Marriage of Figaro (play), a 1778 comedy by Pierre Beaumarchais
 The Marriage of Figaro (1920 film), a German silent historical film
 The Marriage of Figaro (1949 film), an East German musical film
 The Marriage of Figaro (1960 film), an Australian TV film
 "Marriage of Figaro" (Mad Men), an episode of Mad Men
The Marriage of Figaro, a 1799 opera by Marcos Portugal